The Miniature Zebu is a modern American breed of zebuine miniature cattle. A breed association was established in 1991.

History 

India has numerous traditional breeds of very small zebuine cattle, such as the Vechur breed of southern Kerala. These may be collectively known as nadudana, "small cattle".

The Miniature Zebu was established as a breed in the United States with the formation of the International Miniature Zebu Association, a breed registry, in 1991. At that time, there were small zebuine cattle in twenty-three American zoos, and others were held by some fifty private owners. The parent stock had originally been imported from Brazil, the Dominican Republic and Sweden. By 2016 more than 6200 animals were registered.

Characteristics 

References

Cattle breeds
Cattle breeds originating in the United States